Kongen af Danmark (Danish for "King of Denmark") is a type of hard candy with an aniseed flavour. The candy was previously eaten as a cure for cough and for general "chest pains".

The candy is marketed in Sweden by Karamellpojkarna as "Kungen av Danmark". The candies are hard, deep red or purple in colour and classified as cough drops. They are sold in regular and sugar-free versions.

History
According to history, King Christian V of Denmark (1646-1699) had throat pains and was given aniseed oil by his doctor, as was the case with throat pains at the time. The king thought raw aniseed oil tasted too strong, so the doctor blended it with sugar and a small amount of beetroot juice.

The candy was previously known in Sweden as "Kungens av Danmark bröstkarameller" (literally "the king's of Denmark chest sweets") which was later changed to "Kungen av Danmarks bröstkarameller" (literally "the king of Denmark's chest sweets"), which is even today mentioned when teaching the grammar of the Swedish language.

See also
 List of candies

References

Candy
Danish confectionery